John Blair Scribner (June 4, 1850 – January 21, 1879) was the president of Charles Scribner's Sons from 1871 to 1879.

Biography

John Blair Scribner was born on June 4, 1850, to Charles Scribner I and Emma Elizabeth Blair (1827-1869). His grandfather and namesake was John Insley Blair. He attended Princeton College, but did not graduate, but instead he came to work at Charles Scribner Company with his father. At the death of his father in 1871, he took over as president of the company.

He married Lucy Ann Skidmore (1853-1931), who created Skidmore College.

Scribner died of pneumonia on January 21, 1879, at the age of 28. According to his obituarist, just before he died, Scribner told his brother, Charles Scribner II, "Cheer up old fellow. You always look on the dark side. I shall soon be all right again." His funeral was held at the Church of the Covenant on January 23, 1879.

References

1850 births
1879 deaths
Princeton University alumni
Charles Scribner's Sons
People from Manhattan
Deaths from pneumonia in New York City
19th-century American businesspeople